Lovely Anand is an Indian politician and former member of the 10th Lok Sabha, the lower house of the Parliament of India and also the granddaughter of Freedom Fighter Rameshwar Prasad Sinha.

She comes from a well connected political family as her mother's cousin Madhuri Singh was a member of parliament in 1980's from Congress party. But her political career started as the debutant candidate for the new Bihar People's Party established by her husband, Anand Mohan Singh, Lovely Anand had defeated a heavyweight parliamentarian Kishori Sinha, the wife of former Bihar Chief Minister Satyendra Narayan Sinha, in a 1994 Lok Sabha by-election in the north Bihar constituency of Vaishali. She did not contest the 1996 elections and failed to re-win it in those of 1999.

Kishori Sinha also  happened to be mother in law of her cousin Shyama Singh (daughter of Madhuri Singh).

Anand has also twice been elected as a Member of the Legislative Assembly (MLA) of Bihar, winning once in Barh and again in Nabinagar.

Her husband, Anand Mohan Singh, whom she had married in 1991, and who had engineered her 1994 by-election success, is serving a life sentence for abetting murder. He had twice been the MP for Sheohar, in 1996 and 1998, and his wife stood as a Samajwadi Party candidate there in the 2014 general election. She claimed that she had switched party allegiance because the Indian National Congress (INC) had "neglected" her after she had unsuccessfully stood as their candidate in that constituency in the 2009 national election and in the Alamnagar constituency at the 2010 Bihar Assembly elections.

In 2015, Anand became involved with the Hindustani Awam Morcha party and contested from Sheohar constituency. She lost the elections by a margin of around 400 votes.

Anand has continued to protest the innocence of her husband, standing for election on that basis and claiming that her husband is the victim of a political conspiracy and has never been a criminal or gang leader. She and some others had been found guilty in the same case as that of her husband, which was determined in 2007 when she was a member of the JDU party, but she later obtained bail and was acquitted on appeal to the High Court.

Anand has a BA degree from Ranchi University. She and her husband have 2 sons and a daughter; her son, Chetan Anand, has also expressed a desire to be elected.

See also
Politics of Bihar

References
Notes

Citations

Living people
India MPs 1991–1996
Members of the Bihar Legislative Assembly
Lok Sabha members from Bihar
People from Vaishali district
1966 births
Place of birth missing (living people)
Samajwadi Party politicians
Indian National Congress politicians from Bihar
Women members of the Bihar Legislative Assembly
Bihar People's Party politicians
20th-century Indian women politicians
20th-century Indian politicians
Women members of the Lok Sabha
Janata Dal (United) politicians
Hindustani Awam Morcha politicians
21st-century Indian women politicians
21st-century Indian politicians
Candidates in the 2014 Indian general election
Rashtriya Janata Party politicians
Samata Party politicians
Indian National Congress politicians
Ranchi University alumni